Arthur Laban Bates (June 6, 1859 – August 26, 1934) was a Republican member of the  United States House of Representatives from the state of Pennsylvania.

Arthur L. Bates (nephew of John Milton Thayer) was born in Meadville, Pennsylvania.  He studied under tutors and was graduated from Allegheny College in  Meadville in 1880.  He studied law and was admitted to the bar in 1882.  He attended Oxford University in England, in 1882 and 1883.  He commenced the practice of law in Meadville in 1884, and was also engaged in the newspaper publishing business in 1899.  He served as city solicitor of Meadville from 1889 to 1896.

Bates was elected as a Republican to the Fifty-seventh and to the five succeeding Congresses.  He declined to be a candidate for renomination in 1912.  He was a delegate to the International Peace Conference at Brussels in 1905 and at Rome in 1911.  He resumed the practice of law and the publishing business in Meadville, and was also engaged in banking.  He was a delegate to the Republican National Convention in 1924.  He died in Meadville in 1934.  Interment in Greendale Cemetery.

Sources

The Political Graveyard

1859 births
1934 deaths
People from Meadville, Pennsylvania
Baptists from Pennsylvania
Allegheny College alumni
Pennsylvania lawyers
Alumni of the University of Oxford
Republican Party members of the United States House of Representatives from Pennsylvania
American expatriates in the United Kingdom
19th-century American newspaper publishers (people)
Burials at Greendale Cemetery